Mikhailovskaya Military Artillery Academy is Russian military academy conducting warrant officer programmes, commissioned officer programmes (specialitet), advance training career commissioned officer programmes (magistratura), and adjunctura programmes. It is located in Saint Petersburg.

History
The Moscow School of Mathematics and Navigation and the Artillery and Engineering Szlachta Corps were the predecessors of the academy. The academy was officially founded as artillery officer school by the order of Generalfeldzeugmeister (highest commander of artillery) of 26 November 1820 №805. In 1855, school was transformed into academy. In 1919, it was renamed the Artillery academy of Red Army. In 1925 it merged into the Red Army Military Technical Academy, was restored in 1953 as Kalinin Artillery Military Academy. Since 1967, it was called Military Artillery Order of Lenin Red Banner Academy named after M.I. Kalinin. It was renamed the Mikhailovskaya Military Artillery Academy by the Decree of the President of Russia of 17 November 1995 №1154.

The Academy marked its biccentenial in 2020.

Educational programmes
The academy prepares artillery officers of all specialities for all military branches.

Alumni
 Rafael Asadov
 Anatoly Blagonravov
 Vladimir Bogomolov
 Nikolai Dimidyuk
 Cao Gangchuan
 Vasiliy Grabin
 Edward Jan Habich
 Georgy Langemak
 Lev Martyushev
 Edward Pietrzyk
 Yevgenii Vasilevich Zolotov

References

External links
 Official website

Military academies of Russia
Military academies of the Soviet Army
Military high schools